The 2021 Mississippi Valley State Delta Devils football team represented Mississippi Valley State University in the 2021 NCAA Division I FCS football season. The Delta Devils played their home games at Rice–Totten Stadium in Itta Bena, Mississippi, and competed in the East Division of the Southwestern Athletic Conference (SWAC). They were led by fourth-year head coach Vincent Dancy.

Schedule

Games summaries

at Murray State

at Stephen F. Austin

vs. Southern

North Carolina Central

at Bethune–Cookman

Alcorn State

Florida A&M

No. 20 Jackson State

at Alabama A&M

Alabama State

at Prairie View A&M

References

Mississippi Valley State
Mississippi Valley State Delta Devils football seasons
Mississippi Valley State Delta Devils football